Joe Perkins (born December 1, 1935) was an American singer whose song, "Little Eeefin' Annie", was a minor hit in 1963, reaching number 76 on the Billboard chart. The song featured eefer Jimmie Riddle. He was born in Nashville, Tennessee.

'Eeef' could possibly relate to 'Eeep', as the native African languages left a distinctive pronunciation pattern upon the English spoken by Americanized Africans. This may have been in part an inspiration to Jerry Garcia to write the song "Eep Hour", and may also have been at least a partial inspiration for The Grateful Dead song, "Cumberland Blues".

References

External links
 Joe Perkins' Little Eeefin' Annie page
 Jimmy Riddle and the lost art of Eefing on npr.org
 Detailed article on Joe's recording career plus discography

1935 births
Living people
American male pop singers
Singers from Nashville, Tennessee